The Master of Martyrs Battalions, or Kata'ib Sayyid al-Shuhada' (KSS) (The Battalions of the Master of Martyrs) is an Iraqi Shia militia formed in 2013. Its stated mission is to protect "(Shia) shrines across the globe", preserve "Iraqi unity" and to "put an end to the sectarian conflict". 

The group has been described as an Iranian proxy, and is one of the original militias that formed the Popular Mobilization Forces in 2014. The group has close ties to the Badr Organization.

The group is also active in Syria, where its main focus is the protection of the Sayyidah Zaynab Mosque in the southern suburbs of Damascus. It militarily supports the al-Assad Government in the Syria Civil War, and engaged in the Battle of Al-Shaykh Maskin in December 2014 in Syria in support of the Syrian army.

See also

 List of armed groups in the Iraqi Civil War
 List of armed groups in the Syrian Civil War
 Popular Mobilization Forces
 Holy Shrine Defender
 Private militias in Iraq

References

External links
 

Anti-ISIL factions in Iraq
Anti-ISIL factions in Syria
Iraqi involvement in the Syrian civil war
Popular Mobilization Forces
Pro-government factions of the Syrian civil war
Khomeinist groups
Paramilitary organizations based in Iraq
Islamism in Iraq
2013 establishments in Iraq
Military units and formations established in 2013
Jihadist groups in Iraq
Jihadist groups in Syria
Anti-Zionism in Iraq
Anti-Americanism
Arab militant groups